William Vaughan (18 December 1898 – 1976) was an English professional footballer who played as an inside left. He made appearances in the English Football League for Bristol Rovers, Wrexham, Exeter City, Merthyr Town and Luton Town. He also was a journeyman in football, playing for a total of 17 clubs across England and Wales throughout his 15-year career.

References

1898 births
1976 deaths
Welsh footballers
Association football defenders
English Football League players
Willenhall F.C. players
Bristol Rovers F.C. players
Stafford Rangers F.C. players
Merthyr Town F.C. players
Shrewsbury Town F.C. players
Wrexham A.F.C. players
Bilston Town F.C. players
Burton Town F.C. players
Exeter City F.C. players
Luton Town F.C. players
Brierley Hill Alliance F.C. players
Gresley F.C. players
Bloxwich Strollers F.C. players
Cheltenham Town F.C. players
Walsall Wood F.C. players
Winsford United F.C. players
People from Willenhall
English footballers